Robert Burrant (fl. 1553) was an English translator.

He authored works such as an edition of Sir David Lyndsay's , printed by J. Day and W. Serres. This extremely rare volume is in the Grenville Library in the British Museum. It contains a long preface from Roberte Burrante to the Reader, in which, after twenty pages on the judgments of God against evil-doers, he speaks of Beaton's enmity against the gospel and against England, of his habit of swearing, and of his condemnation of George Wishart on 31 March 1546.

References
 

16th-century English writers
16th-century male writers
English translators
Year of birth missing